The Food and Nutrition Service (FNS) is an agency of the United States Department of Agriculture (USDA). The FNS is the federal agency responsible for administering the nation’s domestic nutrition assistance programs. The service helps to address the issue of hunger in the United States.

FNS administers the programs through its headquarters in Alexandria, VA; regional offices in San Francisco, Denver, Dallas, Chicago, Atlanta, Boston, and Robbinsville (NJ); and field offices throughout the US. While its staff number among the USDA's fewest, its budget is by far the largest.

The Food and Nutrition Service is funded under the umbrella of United States Department of Agriculture (USDA) through the annual Agriculture, Rural Development, Food and Drug Administration, and Related Agencies appropriations bill. In 2019, $27 billion was allocated for discretionary funding for USDA, which is spread out over many services including WIC, food safety, and other services. Of the expected people to be served in 2019, the estimate for SNAP recipients is 40.8 million, 30 million to have received school lunches, 15 million to have received school breakfast, 6.6 million participating in WIC, and 690,000 elderly people receiving Commodity Supplemental Food Program.

The FNS uses grants to distribute funds to companies that compete to provide services for the agency. For noncompetitive awards, grants may also be awarded using a technical evaluation. During a Request for Application Funding Announcement (RFA), the FNS releases a Request for Applications (RFA) outlining program goals, requirements, and timetables. Solicitors may submit their applications for consideration. Applications are reviewed for completeness, risk assessment, eligibility, and cost analysis. Potential candidates then undergo a negotiation process. Selected recipients then are awarded the grant, which is further subjected to post-award monitoring and auditing to ensure the grant requirements are being fulfilled. Any conflicts in the process are handled by the Grants Management Office. At the closeout of the grant, a final review is conducted to ensure all aspects of the negotiations have been met.

Partnership programs exist within the FNS that encourage entities that are either non-profit, faith-based, government, or corporate that want to contribute to ending hunger. Through volunteering time, by donations and grants to supporting programs, encourage local purchase/selling of produce and products, or by providing food to those in needs through a financial reimbursement program, the FNS encourages all communities to participate. A Partnership Agreement Form is necessary to provide recognition between the FNS and the providing entity.

An "Ask the Expert" page is available to answer common questions and provide direction on where to find information. Everything from information about where to find food recalls, FNS program support, import/exporting plants, farmer support, conservation, civil rights, and many other topics are cataloged and available for searching. For information not found, questions can be submitted for a program expert to reply to you via email.

The FNS, like all related government programs, actively encourage the reporting of fraud at any level to reduce improper use of federal funds. In addition to reporting fraud to the USDA Office of Inspector General directly, every state has contact points to report unlawful fraud. The Civil Rights Division is charged with ensuring lawful and timely delivery of services for all their employees and customers.

History
Several FNS programs pre-date the creation of the agency and trace their roots back to Depression-era programs.
FNS was established on August 8, 1969 as an agency of the United States Department of Agriculture (USDA). The first Administrator was Edward J. Hekman, former President of the Keebler Company, who served until the end the Ford Administration. 

In 2018, 11.1% of the US population were deemed as being 'food insecure'. This is a 0.07% decrease from 2017. Food insecurity is deemed as a household not having enough resources or insufficient funds to provide for everyone in their family. This equates to 37.2 million people affected by food insecurity. Non-white ethnicity groups are most impacted, while groups such as poverty stricken (with an income-to-poverty ratio under 1.00) and single women with children lead with higher percentages of households affected. States with an affected food security average of 15% or more that were polled within 2016-2018 are New Mexico, Texas, Oklahoma, Arkansas, Louisiana, Missouri, Alabama, Indiana, Kentucky, Ohio, West Virginia, and North Carolina.

Services
FNS products and services are provided to one in five Americans; its main products and services include:
 commodities supplied as: prepared meals that are served at congregate feeding sites; food packages that may be used for home consumption; and disaster relief assistance
 food assistance through electronic benefit transfer (EBT) cards; nutritionally balanced, low-cost or free meals and snacks; vouchers; and, fresh, locally grown produce
 nutrition education and promotion materials and presentations delivered by expert staff and senior managers; and
 food safety and security efforts, technical assistance and informational materials

Core Nutrition Messages is a consumer facing nutrition education advocacy program within the FNS that is designed to follow the Dietary Guidelines for Americans (DGA). It ties in the dietary needs of whole grains, low fat milk, fruits, and vegetables while providing advice and guidance on best practices. It is designed to guide users of the programs towards healthy food choices by suggesting portion sizes and food types. Available communications include motivational messages and guidance such as "Milk matters." and "They take their lead from you ...", along with videos and even kids games.

One of the many FNS outreach programs, National School Lunch Program, has a focus on National School Lunch Week that runs mid October. Culminating many activities geared towards children, there are marketing materials for parents, teachers, and School Nutrition Professionals on how to support children's food choices. The Choose My Plate website provides educational materials catered to many different audience levels for support on identifying healthy foods, recipes, eating on a budget, and cultivating a plan for eating healthy and balanced foods based on USDA recommendations.

The FNS has a Twitter presence under "USDA FNS" as @USDANutrition at Twitter garnering nearly 90k followers with over 17k tweets as of October 2019.

Nutrition assistance programs

These products and services are provided through fifteen domestic nutrition assistance programs:

 Child and Adult Care Food Program (CACFP)
 Fresh Fruit and Vegetable Program (FFVP)
 National School Lunch Program (NSLP) — Lunches subsidized by the NSLP are nearly ubiquitous in public schools. The program has operated since 1946.
 School Breakfast Program (SBP)
 Special Milk Program (SMP)
 Summer Food Service Program (SFSP)
 Food Assistance for Disaster Relief (FADR)
 Food Distribution Programs/USDA Foods
 Commodity Supplemental Food Program (CSFP)
 Food Distribution Program on Indian Reservations (FDPIR)
 Temporary Emergency Food Assistance Program (TEFAP)
 Office of Food Safety
 Special Supplemental Nutrition Program for Women, Infants and Children (WIC)
 Farmers' Market Nutrition Program / Senior Farmers' Market Nutrition Program (FMNP)/(SFMNP)
 Senior Farmers' Market Nutrition Program (SFMNP)
 Supplemental Nutrition Assistance Program (SNAP) — Formerly known as the Food Stamp program, SNAP is now the cornerstone of USDA's nutrition assistance.
 Nutrition Assistance Block Grants, including Nutrition Assistance for Puerto Rico
 Center for Nutrition Policy and Promotion (CNPP)

The FNS is in charge of the national "Eat Smart. Play Hard." campaign, which encourages Americans (more specifically, children and teens) to follow the healthy eating guidelines set by MyPyramid. The spokescharacter of the "Eat Smart. Play Hard." campaign is Power Panther.

FNS Reporting is available for fiscal years broken down by month based on food costs and participation for many of the offered programs.

The Office of Community Food Systems (OCFS) purpose is to support the many programs that run underneath it with a focus on using locally grown foods to support local economies. Most of these programs are geared towards children, although the Child and Adult Care Food Program (CACFP) includes day care for both children and seniors over 60 years old. The USDA Farm to School Grant Program is funded through the use of grants by the USDA, with 2019 seeing nearly $10 million awarded supporting 3.2 million students in over 5,400 schools across 42 states. The program also seeks to encourage young children to pursue careers related to the creation and distribution of food supplies.

See also
 Food preferences in older adults and seniors
 Title 7 of the Code of Federal Regulations

References

External links
 
 Food and Nutrition Service in the Federal Register

United States Department of Agriculture agencies
Food security in the United States
1969 establishments in the United States